"Blinded by the Lights" is a song by English rapper and producer Mike Skinner under the music project the Streets. It was released in September 2004 as the third single from the project's second studio album A Grand Don't Come for Free. The song reached number ten on the UK Single Chart and was certified Silver by the British Phonographic Industry.

Critical reception
Leonie Cooper of NME called the best part of the song the, "massive wobbly synth line." Decca Aitkenhead of The Guardian said that, "nothing has ever evoked the atmosphere of clubbing on ecstasy in the 90s more perfectly." Ethan Brown of New York called the song, "a panicky haze of impure pills, paranoia, and social isolation." Andy Battaglia of The A.V. Club called the song, "a sparse, moody track that gets washed in whoosh as his second dose of ecstasy kicks in."

Music video
The music video was directed by Adam Smith and premiered in September 2004.

Charts

Certifications

References

2004 songs
2004 singles
The Streets songs
Locked On Records singles
679 Artists singles